Frank Arthur Connah (1884 – 20 December 1954) was a Welsh field hockey player who won a bronze medal as part of the Welsh team in the 1908 Summer Olympics.

References

External links
 

1884 births
1954 deaths
Welsh male field hockey players
Olympic field hockey players of Great Britain
British male field hockey players
Field hockey players at the 1908 Summer Olympics
Olympic bronze medallists for Great Britain
Olympic medalists in field hockey
Welsh Olympic medallists
Medalists at the 1908 Summer Olympics